François de Gaulle (13 February 1922 – 2 April 2020) was a French Catholic priest and missionary.

Biography
The nephew of Charles de Gaulle, François joined the White Fathers in 1940, and entered seminary in Tunisia. Starting in 1950, he spent 50 years in French Upper Volta, and watched as it transitioned to Burkina Faso.

De Gaulle was the author of J'ai vu se lever l'Église d'Afrique, produced from interviews with Victor Macé de Lépinay and published in 2011.

De Gaulle died on 2 April 2020 in Bry-sur-Marne at the age of 98 due to COVID-19 during the pandemic in France.

References

1922 births
2020 deaths
De Gaulle family
Deaths from the COVID-19 pandemic in France
White Fathers priests
People from Montceau-les-Mines
French Roman Catholic missionaries
Roman Catholic missionaries in Burkina Faso
20th-century French Roman Catholic priests
21st-century French Roman Catholic priests